Khawaja (Persian: خواجه khvâjəh) is an honorific title used across the Middle East, South Asia, Southeast Asia and Central Asia, particularly towards Sufi teachers.

It is also used by Kashmiri Muslims and the Mizrahi Jews—particularly Persian Jews and Baghdadi Jews. The word comes from the Iranian word khwāja (Classical Persian:  khwāja; Dari khājah; Tajik khoja). In Persian, the title roughly translates to 'Lord' or 'Master'.

The Ottoman Turkish pronunciation of the Persian خواجه gave rise to hodja and its equivalents such as hoca in modern Turkish, hoxha in Albanian, xoca (khoja) in Azerbaijani, hodža in Bosnian, χότζας (chótzas) in Greek, hogea in Romanian, and хоџа in Serbian.

Other spellings include khaaja (Bengali) and koja (Javanese).

The name is also used in Egypt and Sudan to indicate a person with a foreign nationality or foreign heritage.

Etymology

Ultimately derived from a Middle Indo-Aryan reflex of Sanskrit उपाध्याय (upādhyāya, “teacher; preceptor; spiritual adviser”), via Central Asian intermediaries.Various Middle Indo-Aryan reflexes are attested from all stages, including Maharashtri Prakrit 𑀉𑀯𑀚𑁆𑀛𑀸𑀅 (uvajjhāa), but the Central Asian loaning source most closely resembles an unattested *𑀯𑀸𑀚𑁆𑀛𑀸𑀅 (*vājjhāa) — matching Sindhi واجهو‎ (vājho, “Hindu schoolteacher”). The initial aspiration in Classical Persian خواجه (xwāja) is also found in Khwarezmian خواجیک‎ (xwʾjyk /xwājīk/, “venerated man”) and Chinese 和尚 (héshàng, “Buddhist monk”).

Gallery

See also 
 Khwaja Khizr Tomb at Sonipat
Afaq Khoja Mausoleum in Kashgar
 Khwajagan, a network of Sufis in Central Asia from the 10th to the 16th century who are often incorporated into later Naqshbandi hierarchies.
 Khajeh Nouri (Or Khajenouri), a Persian family belonging to pre-revolution nobility, their family tree can be traced back 45 generations.
 Khojaly, a town in Azerbaijan.
 Khoja (Turkestan), a title of the descendants of the Central Asian Naqshbandi Sufi teacher, Ahmad Kasani
 Hoca, Turkish spelling of Khawaja
 Hoxha, Albanian surname
 Hodžić, Bosniak surname
 Koya, a medieval Indian administrative position

References 

Islamic honorifics
Islamic Persian honorifics
Islamic Urdu honorifics
Titles
Turkish words and phrases
Persian words and phrases
Bengali words and phrases
Albanian words and phrases